Sideroxylon grandiflorum, known as tambalacoque or dodo tree, is a long-lived  mesocaul tree in the sapote family Sapotaceae, superfiially resembling the unrelated Plumeria, but the Dodo Tree's flowers and fruit are cauliflorous. It is endemic to Mauritius. It is valued for its timber. The Sideroxylon grandiflorum fruit is analogous to the peach. They are both termed drupes because both have a hard endocarp, or pit, surrounding the seed,

History

In 1973, it was thought that this species was dying out. There were supposedly only 13 specimens left, all estimated to be about 300 years old. The true age could not be determined because tambalacoque has no growth rings. Stanley Temple hypothesized that the dodo, which became extinct in the 17th century, ate tambalacoque fruits, and only by passing through the digestive tract of the dodo could the seeds germinate. Temple (1977) force-fed seventeen tambalacoque fruits to wild turkeys. Seven of the fruits were crushed by the bird's gizzard. The remaining ten were either regurgitated or passed with the bird's feces. Temple planted the remaining ten fruits and three germinated. Temple did not try to germinate any seeds from control fruits not fed to turkeys so the effect of feeding fruits to turkeys was unclear. Reports made on tambalacoque seed germination by Hill (1941) and King (1946) found the seeds germinated without abrading...

Temple's hypothesis that the tree required the dodo was contested. Others have suggested the decline of the tree was exaggerated, or that other extinct animals may also have been distributing the seeds, such as tortoises, fruit bats or the broad-billed parrot. The difference in numbers is because young trees are not distinct in appearance and may easily be confused with similar species. The decline of the tree may possibly be due to introduction of domestic pigs and crab-eating macaques, and competition from introduced plants. Catling (2001) in a summary cites Owadally and Temple (1979), and Witmer (1991). Hershey (2004) reviewed the flaws in Temple's dodo-tambalacoque hypothesis.

In 2004, Botanical Society of America's Plant Science Bulletin disputed Temple's research as flawed.  The Bulletin published evidence as to why the dodo's extinction did not directly cause the increasing disappearance of young trees, including suggestions that tortoises would have been more likely to disperse the seeds than dodos, casting doubt on Temple's view as to the dodo and the tree's sole survival relationship.

Uses
This dodo tree is highly valued for its wood in Mauritius, which has led some foresters to scrape the pits by hand to make them sprout and grow.

See also
 Sideroxylon majus, a species native to Réunion, that has been confounded with Sideroxylon grandiflorum (particularly under its synonym Calvaria major)

References

External links
 Catling, P. M. (2001): Extinction and the importance of history and dependence in conservation. Biodiversity 2(3): 2-13 pdf
 Helfferich, C. (1990): The Turkey and the Tambalacoque Tree
 Hershey, D. R. (2004): The widespread misconception that the tambalacoque absolutely required the dodo for its seeds to germinate. Plant Science Bulletin 50: 105–108.
 Hill, A. W. (1941): The genus Calvaria, with an account of the stony endocarp and germination of the seed, and description of the new species. Annals of Botany 5(4): 587–606. PDF fulltext (requires user account)
 King, H. C. (1946): Interim Report on Indigenous Species in Mauritius. Port Louis, Mauritius: Government Printer.
 Owadally, A. W. & Temple, Stanley A. (1979): The dodo and the tambalacoque tree. Science 203(4387): 1363–1364.
 Quammen, David (1996): The Song of the Dodo: Island Biogeography in an Age of Extinction. Touchstone, New York. 
 Temple, Stanley A. (1977): Plant-animal mutualism: coevolution with Dodo leads to near extinction of plant. Science 197(4306): 885–886. HTML abstract
 Witmer, M. C. & Cheke, A. S. (1991): The dodo and the tambalacoque tree: an obligate mutualism reconsidered. Oikos 61(1): 133–137. HTML abstract

grandiflorum
Endemic flora of Mauritius
Trees of Africa